Terreiro Velho is a village in the southeastern part of Príncipe Island in São Tomé and Príncipe. Its population is 152 (2012 census). Terreiro Velho lies 3 km south of the island capital of Santo António and 1 km southwest of Nova Estrela. In the mid-1990s, Italian businessman Claudio Corallo bought an abandoned 120 hectares cocoa plantation in Terreiro Velho, and restored it to produce high quality chocolate.

Population history

References

Populated places in the Autonomous Region of Príncipe